Răducăneni is a commune in Iași County, Western Moldavia, Romania. It is composed of four villages: Bohotin, Isaiia, Răducăneni and Roșu.

See also
Busuioacă de Bohotin

References

Communes in Iași County
Localities in Western Moldavia